The Hotel Lankershim was a landmark hotel located at Seventh Street and Broadway in downtown Los Angeles, California in the United States. Construction began in 1902 and was completed in 1905. The building was largely demolished in the early 1980s following structural damage caused by the 1971 Sylmar earthquake. The "posh" hotel had nine stories, 300 rooms and two dining rooms.

The hotel was built by James Boon Lankershim and in the early years he also lived in the building. He had previously constructed a building called Lankershim Flats, located across the street, and demolished in 1906. In early days the hotel ran a shuttle to ferry guests to and from the nearby train stations.

He sold the lease to Wallace W. Whitecotton of the Shattuck Hotel in Berkeley in 1919. Whitecotton sold it to E.P. Severcool and E.B. Edmonds in 1926.

A "bathing establishment" was to be installed 1921. Circa 1915, the hotel marketed itself as within a “stone’s throw” of Bullock’s and Hamburger’s Department Stores, as well as the Orpheum, Morosco and Majestic Theaters. In the late 1950s it offered a cocktail bar, a piano bar, and a coffee shop.

Gallery

References 

Lankershim
Lankershim
Broadway (Los Angeles)